Bruce M. Brenn (born 1935) is an American businessman, honored by the government of Japan for having "contributed to the promotion of education for the study of Japan, the deepening of understanding between Japan and the United States and the development of the sporting world in Japan."

Early life

As a 14-year-old boy in Tokyo at the end of the Second World War, he was one of four Western teen-aged boys who helped Japan's Crown Prince Akihito
practice English conversation.

Although he was born in Idaho, Brenn went to college at the University of Oregon in Eugene, Oregon. In 1958, he was part of the Oregon football team that went to the Rose Bowl.

Career
Brenn was Vice Chairman and Chief Executive Officer of Nike in Japan.  The Nike corporate headquarters are located in Beaverton, Oregon; and even though he lived many years in Japan, working with Nike also served to enhance his sense of connection to the state of Oregon where he would later live in retirement.

Earlier in his career, he was a Citibank vice president in Tokyo.

Portland activist
Brenn helped develop a Japanese-language program in the Portland public schools that evolved into the immersion program at Richmond Elementary School.

As Chairman of the Center for Japanese Studies Advisory Board, Brenn actively supported the growth of the Center for Japanese Studies at Portland State University.

Honors
 Order of the Rising Sun, Gold Rays with Rosette, 2009.

Notes

References
 Japanese Ministry of Foreign Affairs,  "2009 Autumn Conferment of Decorations on Foreign Nationals," p. 6.

University of Oregon alumni
Recipients of the Order of the Rising Sun
Living people
1935 births
Businesspeople from Oregon
20th-century American businesspeople